(born December 24, 1991 in Hokkaido, Japan) is a former Japanese figure skater. She won the 2009 Golden Spin of Zagreb.

Programs

Competitive highlights
JGP: Junior Grand Prix

References

 Japan Skating Federation official results & data site

External links 

Japanese female single skaters
1991 births
Living people
Kansai University alumni
Sportspeople from Sapporo
Universiade medalists in figure skating
Universiade bronze medalists for Japan
Competitors at the 2011 Winter Universiade